Boleopsis is an extinct genus of beetles from the Eocene aged Oise amber of France; it contains a single described species, Boleopsis polinae, and is the only member of the family Boleopsidae.

References

External links
 

Prehistoric beetle genera
Cleroidea
Fossils of France
Fossil taxa described in 2013